Arreau is a commune in the Hautes-Pyrénées department in southwestern France.

It is situated on the former Route nationale 618, the Route of the Pyrénées. Arreau is at the crossroads of the Louron valley and the Aure valley.

Geography

Climate

Arreau has a oceanic climate (Köppen climate classification Cfb).

Population

See also
Communes of the Hautes-Pyrénées department

References

Communes of Hautes-Pyrénées